Electric platform trucks are electric powered trucks with a large flat surface for holding objects to be transported. Some are also called warehouse utility vehicles, electric trolley carts, or powered platform truck vehicles.  Electric platform trucks can vary greatly in size, from large ride-on utility vehicles, to much smaller pedestrian operated trolleys. Electric tugs can be combined with nonpowered carts or hand trucks to achieve the same result.

A milk float is a specialised version of an electric platform truck specifically designed for the delivery of fresh milk, common in the United Kingdom.

See also 
 Neighborhood Electric Vehicle
 Canoo Last-Mile micro-Van for Walllmart
 Goupil French mini-Pickup EV for Picnic Groceries

Notes

Battery electric vehicles
Trucks